This is a list of American symphonic metal bands, including bands that at some point in their career played symphonic metal.

List

A 
 Abigail Williams
 Actus Melodi

F 
 Funebre

S 
 Savatage
 Saviour Machine
 Shield of Wings
 Skillet
 Suspyre
 Symphony X

T 
 Trans-Siberian Orchestra

V 
 Vesperian Sorrow
 Virgin Steele

References 
 ^ All items in this list were taken from this list.

American symphonic metal